Happy Together is a 2018 South Korean drama film directed by Kim Jung-hwan. It was released on November 15, 2018.

Premise
The story revolves around Suk-jin and his son, Ha-neul, who earn a living by playing music together on night stages, as they struggle to achieve a successful life.

Cast
Park Sung-woong as Kang Suk-jin
Song Sae-byeok as Park Young-geol 
Choi Ro-woon as Ha-neul (younger)
Han Sang-hyuk as Ha-neul
Kwon Hae-hyo as Dal-su
Jung In-gi as Captain Choi
Song Duk-ho as Peter / Pedro
Lee Jae-yong as Chairman Kim
Sung Byung-sook as Nun Veronica
Cho Seung-hee as Nun Maria

Production
Principal photography began on October 14, 2017.

Release
The film was released on November 15, 2018, alongside Unfinished and Hollywood film Fantastic Beasts: The Crimes of Grindelwald, which was released a day earlier.

References

External links
 Happy Together on Naver 
 Happy Together on Daum 
 Happy Together on Hancinema

2018 films
2010s Korean-language films
2010s musical drama films
South Korean musical drama films
2018 drama films
2010s South Korean films